After Midnight is a 1921 American silent drama film directed by Ralph Ince and starring Conway Tearle, Zena Keefe and Warren Black.

Cast
 Conway Tearle as Gordon Phillips / Wallace Phillips
 Zena Keefe as Mrs. Gordon Phillips
 Warren Black as Mock Sing
 Harry Allen as Harris
 Macey Harlam as Warren Black
 Woo Lang as Toy Sing

References

Bibliography
 Munden, Kenneth White. The American Film Institute Catalog of Motion Pictures Produced in the United States, Part 1. University of California Press, 1997.

External links
 

1921 films
1921 drama films
1920s English-language films
American silent feature films
Silent American drama films
American black-and-white films
Films directed by Ralph Ince
Selznick Pictures films
1920s American films